The Centennial Work Center in Medicine Bow National Forest near Centennial, Wyoming was built in 1938. It was built to replace the nearby Centennial Ranger Station. It was designed by USDA Forest Service, Region 2 in USFS rustic architecture and served as a government office. It was listed on the National Register of Historic Places for its architecture.

The office/bunkhouse and bunkhouse are both of horizontal saddle-notched log construction with wood shingled gable roofs. Both were built in 1938 and 1939. The office contains an office/living room, kitchen, bunk room, small utility room and a basement under the living room and kitchen. It was originally built with an attached two car garage, but this was converted into a bunk room in 1964. The bunkhouse contains a kitchen, three bunk rooms, living room with stone fireplace, dining room, bathroom and a full basement. A brass plaque in front of the bunkhouse memorializes Robert Fechner, who was National Director of the Civilian Conservation Corp (CCC) from 1933 until his death in 1939.

The garage is a rectangular wood-frame building with log siding. It contains two bays, two workrooms, and two small storage rooms. It was built from 1938 to 1940, with a 450 square foot addition to the south end in 1962.

All three contributing structures were built mostly by crews from the Mullen Creek Camp (F-36-W) of the CCC, with some work also being done by Ryan Park Side Camp (F-22-W) crews.

References

External links
 Bath Row Historic District at the Wyoming State Historic Preservation Office

United States Forest Service architecture
Park buildings and structures on the National Register of Historic Places in Wyoming
Government buildings completed in 1938
Buildings and structures in Albany County, Wyoming
Historic districts on the National Register of Historic Places in Wyoming
National Register of Historic Places in Albany County, Wyoming